Barefooted Youth (Hangul: 맨발의 청춘 - Maenbaleui cheongchun) is a 1964 South Korean film directed by Kim Ki-duk. It is one of the best-known examples of the "adolescent film" genre that was popular in South Korea during the 1960s. In 1997, it was adapted as a television series starring Bae Yong-joon and Ko So-young.

Synopsis
A good-hearted young gangster falls in love with a diplomat's daughter. When their romance is opposed by her mother, they commit suicide together.

Cast
Shin Seong-il
Um Aing-ran
Lee Ye-chun
Yoon Il-bong
Lee Min-ja

Notes

Bibliography

External links 
 
 

1964 films
1960s Korean-language films
South Korean romance films
1960s romance films